Robert of York (died after 1219) was a medieval Bishop of Ely-elect.

Robert was elected to Ely about 14 April 1215 but his election was quashed before 11 May 1219 due to the prior election of Geoffrey de Burgo. Both elections were quashed by Pope Honorius III. Robert refused to accept the decision of the pope and fled to France, where he was still styling himself bishop-elect in December 1219.

Citations

References

 
 

Bishops of Ely
13th-century English Roman Catholic bishops
12th-century births
13th-century deaths
Year of birth unknown
Year of death unknown